Edwin Straver (12 April 1971 – 24 January 2020) was a Dutch motorcycle racer.

Career
Straver was particularly known for his participation in the Dakar Rally. He participated in 2018, 2019 and 2020. In 2019 he won the classification in the class in which the driver himself must do all the maintenance on the engine; the so-called "Original by Motul".

On 16 January, during the eleventh stage of the Dakar 2020 rally in Saudi Arabia, Straver crashed his motorcycle. He was resuscitated on site and then taken to a hospital in Riyadh. It was found here that one of his upper cervical vertebrae was broken. On 22 January, he was transferred to the Netherlands, where he died two days later.

He was the son of five-time Dutch road racing champion for motorcycles Anton Straver.

References

1971 births
2020 deaths
Dutch motorcycle racers
Enduro riders
Off-road motorcycle racers
Dakar Rally motorcyclists
Motorcycle racers who died while racing
Sport deaths in Saudi Arabia
People from Almkerk
Sportspeople from North Brabant
20th-century Dutch people